Phyllonorycter echinosparti is a moth of the family Gracillariidae. It is known from Portugal and western and central Spain.

The forewing ground colour is highly variable, as are the number of black scales.

The larvae feed on Echinospartum lusitanicum, Genista cinerascens, Genista florida, Genista hystrix, Genista polyanthos, Genista scorpius and Stauracanthus genistoides. They mine the thorns of their host plant.

References

echinosparti
Moths of Europe
Moths described in 2006